What Ever Happened to Baby Toto? is a 1964 Italian black comedy film written and directed by Ottavio Alessi, starring Totò. It is a parody of Robert Aldrich's  What Ever Happened to Baby Jane?.

Plot 
A pair of step brothers, Totò Baby and Pietro, make a living stealing suitcases at the Termini Station in Rome. They discover within a stolen piece of luggage a corpse. Trying to get rid of the incriminating evidence, they mistakenly swap the suitcase with a German hitchhiker.

Forced to retrieve the "corpus delicti" they are discovered by Mischa, a Count who is hosting the beautiful foreign tourists. He decides to blackmail the step brothers, asking for their assassination of his rich wife, in exchange for his silence with the police.

After the death of the woman (who loses her life as a result of a fright), Totò Baby becomes a sadistic serial killer as he loses all inhibition after starting to eat by mistake marijuana as if it were lettuce. 
He kills the Count and more people, including a young postman which is then walled up inside Misha's villa. He then escapes and forces his brother to follow him. He drags him to the beach and seems about to leave him buried alive in the sand with broken legs, but gets recognized and arrested by chance by the police. He ends up committed in an institute for the criminally insane, where he spends his time typing his autobiography on an imaginary typewriter.

Cast 
Totò as  Baby Toto /  Baby Toto's father
Pietro De Vico as   Pietro
Mischa Auer as  Mischa (The Count)
Alvaro Alvisi as   Police Commissioner
Ivy Holzer as   Inga
Alicia Brandet as   Helga
Gina Mascetti as    Mischa's wife
Mario Castellani as   The director of the orphanage
Olimpia Cavalli as   Baby Toto's stepmother
Peppino De Martino as   The Maresciallo
Franco Ressel as   The American Official
Giuseppe Tosi as tall man
Renato Montalbano as The young postman

References

External links

1964 films
1960s black comedy films
1960s parody films
Italian parody films
Italian black comedy films
Films set in Rome
Films shot in Rome
Films with screenplays by Giovanni Grimaldi
1964 comedy films
1964 drama films
1960s Italian-language films
1960s Italian films